Silky oak is a common name for Grevillea robusta.

Silky oak may also refer to:

Plants
Silky oak is the common name for certain trees and large shrubs in the family Proteaceae as well as their timber products, most notably Grevillea robusta. Others include:

Alloxylon flammeum, red silky oak, Pink Silky Oak, Satin Silky Oak
Alloxylon wickhamii , Pink Silky Oak, Satin Silky Oak
Athertonia diversifolia, cream silky oak
Austromuellera trinervia, Muellers silky oak
Bleasdalea bleasdalei, blush silky oak 
Cardwellia, northern silky oak
Carnarvonia araliifolia, Caledonian Silky Oak, red silky oak
Darlingia darlingiana, rose silky oak, brown silky oak
Darlingia ferruginea, rose silky oak, brown silky oak, Rusty Silky Oak
Gevuina bleasdalei, wingleaf silky oak
Grevillea banksii, red silky oak, dwarf silky oak 
A white-flowered form, white silky oak
Grevillea hilliana, white silky oak, Hill's silky oak
Grevillea pteridifolia, Darwin silky oak, ferny-leaved silky oak
Helicia australasica, Austral Silky Oak,  creek silky oak
Helicia blakei, Blake's Silky Oak
Helicia grayi, Lamington's Silky Oak
Helicia nortoniana, Norton’s Silky Oak
Hicksbeachia pinnatifolia, ivory silky oak
Hollandia sayeriana', Sayer’s Silky OakMusgravea heterophylla, briar silky oakOreocallis wickhamii, red silky oakOrites excelsus, mountain silky oakStenocarpus sinuatus, white silky oakStenocarpus salignus, red silky oak

Places
 Silky Oak, Queensland, a locality in the Cassowary Coast Region, Queensland, Australia